Magnolol is an organic compound that is classified as lignan. It is a bioactive compound found in the bark of the Houpu magnolia (Magnolia officinalis) or in M. grandiflora. The compound exists at the level of a few percent in the bark of species of magnolia, the extracts of which have been used in traditional Chinese and Japanese medicine.  In addition to magnolol, related lignans occur in the extracts including honokiol, which is an isomer of magnolol.

Bioactivity
It is known to act on the GABAA receptors in rat cells in vitro as well as having antifungal properties.  Magnolol has a number of osteoblast-stimulating and osteoclast-inhibiting activities in cell culture and has been suggested as a candidate for screening for anti-osteoporosis activity. It has anti-periodontal disease activity in a rat model.  Structural analogues have been studied and found to be strong allosteric modulators of  GABAA.
Magnolol is also binding in dimeric mode to PPARγ, acting as an agonist of this nuclear receptor.

References

Further reading

 

GABAA receptor positive allosteric modulators
Cannabinoids
Biphenyls
Lignans
Phenols
Allyl compounds